This is a list of destinations served by Air New Zealand, the flagship air carrier of New Zealand. The airline serves 30 international passenger destinations and one cargo destination in 18 countries and territories. Along with 20 domestic destinations are served. Terminated destinations are also listed (excluding those served only by its predecessors, TEAL and National Airways Corporation).

In the first quarter of 2020, the airline stopped serving many international destinations for at least 3 months due to the impact of COVID-19. The following is a list of Air New Zealand destinations as of August 2022:

List

Notes

References

Lists of airline destinations
Destinations
New Zealand transport-related lists
Star Alliance destinations